Pittwood might refer to:

Pittwood, Illinois, an unincorporated community in the United States
R v Pittwood, a case in English criminal law relating to omissions